Salvatierra de los Barros is a municipality in the province of Badajoz, Extremadura, Spain. It has a population of 1,721 (2014) and an area of 75 km².

References

Municipalities in the Province of Badajoz